Rasmus Rasmussen (1850–1921) was an American merchant and businessman of Manistee and Ludington, Michigan. He operated a Great Lakes schooner and was in the lumber business transporting lumber related material around Lake Michigan. He also owned and operated a boardinghouse and saloon.

Biography
Rasmus Rasmussen was born in Denmark in May, 1850. He immigrated to the United States in 1870. He first went to Manistee, Michigan. There he met Anna Nelson, his future wife. She worked as a maid in a boarding house. Neither knew English, only Danish. They married and traveled from Manistee to Ludington by stagecoach to there set up household in a "Travelers' Home." They had nothing but the clothes on their back.

Rasmussen was president of the Danish Aid-Society and was supervisor of the Fourth Ward in Ludington for 3 terms. Rasmussen also served the ward as alderman and city assessor for many years. The ward not only had a large population of Danish, but Polish and Germans as well. Many of the men worked in the lumber industry in one capacity or another.

Abbie 
Rasmussen operated a schooner called Abbie and was in the tanbark trade business for several years. The schooner was 87 tons and built in 1886 on the site later occupied by the Abrahamson-Herheim Company on Lake Street in Ludington. The 2-mast 83 ton schooner was 88 feet long by 22 feet wide and 6 feet deep.
The schooner that traveled the Great Lakes was named after a nineteenth-century Ludington postmaster's wife in exchange for a windsock for the vessel. The merchandise shipped consisted of local Native Americans' collection of hemlock bark in Oceana County, Michigan. The bark was used for tanning leather. This bark along with wood was shipped with the schooner from Ludington to Chicago and Milwaukee, Wisconsin. The schooner with a cargo of bark was totally wrecked 9 miles north of Manistee near the entrance to Portage Lake in Onekama on November 8, 1905. There was no loss of life. The four on board were saved by a light keeper and the Manistee Life Saving Service.

Lake House 

Rasmussen built in 1877 a boardinghouse and saloon in the Fourth Ward of Ludington called "Lake House", also known as the Lake View hotel. It was located on South Madison Street near Sixth Street. He operated this along with his wife. Rasmussen ran the saloon, while his wife was the maid for the boardinghouse.

A Ludington Daily News newspaper article mentions that one third of the voting population of the city in 1892 was Scandinavian and that it was a safe bet that the head of every one these families was processed through the Lake House. The article explains that the Scandinavian migration was then at its peak to Ludington and that most of the Scandinavians stayed at the Lake House as their first place in Ludington.

The hotel contractor believed to have built it was the firm of Tiedeman & Boerner, Contractors and Builders . The interior woodwork was just like their homes on Washington Avenue in Ludington. The hotel was demolished in September 1989.

Family 
Rasmussen's wife Ane Nelson (1851-1917) was born in Denmark. They married in 1876 and the children they had were
Martha – born 1876
Carrie – born 1879
Hannah – born 1881
Rasmus – born 1883
Mark   – born 1887
 ^ TWINS  v 
Mary   – born 1887
Andrew – born 1890
Hans C. – born 1893
Russell – born 1896

Rasmus Rasmussen died on August 26, 1921 at age 71. He are buried in Lakeview Cemetery in Mason County, Michigan

Legacy 
Rasmussen was referred to as "Old Denmark."

References

Sources 

 

1850 births
1921 deaths
Danish emigrants to the United States
American merchants
People from Ludington, Michigan
Businesspeople from Wisconsin
Businesspeople from Michigan
Michigan city council members
People from Manistee, Michigan